Aweil West County is an administrative area in Northern Bahr el Ghazal, South Sudan.

Location
Western Aweil county is bordered by Aweil North County to the north, Aweil East County to the east, Aweil South County to the southeast, Aweil Central County to the south and Raga County in Western BAhr el Ghazal State to the west.

The county is located in Northern Bahr el Ghazal State, in northwestern South Sudan, close to the border with the Republic of Sudan.

The geographic coordinates of the county are: 9° 30' 0.00"N, 28° 0' 0.00"E (Latitude: 9.0000; Longitude: 27.0000).

Payams of Aweil West County
The county is made up of the following payams (sub-counties):
Chelkou (Gomjuer West)
Maduany (Meiriam East)
Marialbaai (Ayat East)
Mayom Akoon (Gomjuer Ctr.)
Mayom Akuangrel (Ayat Ctr.)
Nyinbuoli (Ayat West)
Udhum (Meiriam West)
Wedweil (Gomjuer East)
(source: http://www.iom.int/jahia/webdav/shared/shared/mainsite/activities/countries/docs/village_assessment_northernbahr.pdf)

Population
According to the 2018 South Sudanese census, the population of Aweil West County was about 166,220. Although these figures were disputed by the authorities in Juba, South Sudan, they are the only recently available population figures and form a baseline on which future estimations can be based.

See also
 Aweil
 Aweil Airport
 Northern Bahr el Ghazal
 Bahr el Ghazal

References

External links
Map of the Counties of South Sudan
Administrative Districts of South Sudan

Counties of South Sudan
Northern Bahr el Ghazal
Bahr el Ghazal